The Sri Lanka women's cricket team toured Pakistan to play against the Pakistan women's cricket team in May and June 2022. The tour consisted of three Women's One Day International (WODI) and three Women's Twenty20 International (WT20I) matches. The WODI matches formed part of the 2022–2025 ICC Women's Championship, and it was the first series of the 2022–2025 ICC Women's Championship. All of the matches were played at the Southend Club Cricket Stadium in Karachi, the first time the venue was used since the West Indies women toured in January and February 2018. On 11 May 2022, Sri Lanka confirmed their squad for the tour, with the Pakistan Cricket Board (PCB) confirming that Bismah Maroof would remain their captain the following day. On 18 May 2022, the PCB named their squads for the tour, which included three uncapped players.

Pakistan won the first WT20I match by six wickets, with Tuba Hassan taking three wickets for eight runs on her international debut. Pakistan won the second match by seven wickets, to win the series with one match to play. Pakistan won the third and final WT20I by four wickets to win the series 3–0.

Pakistan won the opening WODI match by eight wickets. Pakistan won the second WODI by 73 runs, with Sidra Ameen scoring her second WODI century, to give Pakistan a series win with a match to play. Sri Lanka won the final match by 93 runs, with Pakistan winning the WODI series 2–1.

Squads

Rashmi Silva, Kawya Kavindi, Sathya Sandeepani, Tharika Sewwandi and Malsha Shehani were also named as standby players in Sri Lanka's squad.

WT20I series

1st WT20I

2nd WT20I

3rd WT20I

WODI series

1st WODI

2nd WODI

3rd WODI

References

External links
 Series home at ESPN Cricinfo

Sri Lanka 2022
Pakistan 2022
International cricket competitions in 2022
2022 in Pakistani cricket
2022 in Sri Lankan cricket
2022 in women's cricket